Nodar Gvakharia ((February 3, 1932 – November 14, 1996) was a Georgian water polo player, born in Tbilisi. who competed for the Soviet Union in the 1956 Summer Olympics.

He was part of the Soviet team which won the bronze medal in the 1956 tournament. He played three matches and scored four goals.

See also
 List of Olympic medalists in water polo (men)

References

External links
 

1932 births
1996 deaths
Sportspeople from Tbilisi 
Male water polo players from Georgia (country)
Soviet male water polo players
Olympic water polo players of the Soviet Union
Water polo players at the 1956 Summer Olympics
Olympic bronze medalists for the Soviet Union
Olympic medalists in water polo
Medalists at the 1956 Summer Olympics